Buddleja vexans is a recently (2000) recognized species endemic to central Peru, growing along streams, roads and cliffs at altitudes of 3,300 – 3,900 m. Norman adjudged the plant to be a probable hybrid between B. coriacea and B. incana.

Description
Buddleja vexans is a sterile shrub 3 – 5 m high with a trunk < 30 cm in diameter, the bark brown and fissured. The younger branches are terete and tomentose, bearing coriaceous elliptic leaves 4.5 – 8 cm long by 1 – 3 cm wide, glabrous and rugose above, densely tomentose below. The fragrant golden-orange paniculate leafy-bracted inflorescences are 5 – 12 cm long by 5 – 9 cm wide, comprising 1 – 2 orders of branches bearing heads 1.5 – 2 cm in diameter, each with 16 – 20 flowers, the corollas 4 – 5 mm long.

A popular garden plant in Peru, Norman considers B. vexans to have the greatest horticultural merit of all the American buddlejas.

Cultivation
The shrub is not known to be in cultivation beyond Peru.

References

vexans
Flora of Peru
Flora of South America